Paul Ramírez (30 July 1986 – 6 December 2011) was a Venezuelan footballer who played at both professional and international levels, as a striker.

Club career
Ramírez played professional club football in Venezuela, Argentina, Switzerland and Italy for Caracas, Juventud Antoniana, Bellinzona, Udinese, Ascoli, Maracaibo, Minervén and CIV.

International career
He made one international appearance for Venezuela. He played for the Venezuela national under-20 football team, participating at the 2005 South American Youth Championship in Colombia.

Death
Ramírez died of a stroke on 6 December 2011, aged 25.

References

1986 births
2011 deaths
Footballers from Caracas
Venezuelan footballers
Venezuela international footballers
Caracas FC players
Juventud Antoniana footballers
AC Bellinzona players
UA Maracaibo players
Minervén S.C. players
Expatriate footballers in Switzerland
Expatriate footballers in Italy
Expatriate footballers in Argentina
Association football forwards